Wang Yan (born 28 August 1994) is a Chinese judoka.

She is the silver medallist of the 2018 Judo Grand Slam Paris in the +78 kg category.

References

External links
 

1994 births
Living people
Chinese female judoka
Judoka at the 2018 Asian Games
Asian Games bronze medalists for China
Asian Games medalists in judo
Medalists at the 2018 Asian Games
21st-century Chinese women